Carlos Lozada may refer to:

 Carlos Lozada (journalist) (born 1971), Peruvian-American journalist
 Carlos Lozada (Medal of Honor) (1946–1967), member of the United States Army